Pholidota, commonly known as rattlesnake orchids, is a genus of flowering plants from the orchid family, Orchidaceae. Plants in this genus are clump-forming epiphytes or lithophytes with pseudobulbs, each with a single large leaf and a large number of small, whitish flowers arranged in two ranks along a thin, wiry flowering stem that emerges from the top of the pseudobulb. There are about thirty five species native to areas from tropical and subtropical Asia to the southwestern Pacific.

Description
Orchids in the genus Pholidota are sympodial epiphytic, lithophytic or, rarely, terrestrial herbs with pseudobulbs, each with one or two large, stalked leathery leaves. A large number of small flowers are arranged in two ranks along a thin, wiry flowering stem that emerges from the top of the pseudobulb. There is a large, papery bract at the base of each flower. The flowers are white, cream-coloured, yellowish or pinkish with a concave dorsal sepal and smaller petals. The labellum is rigidly fixed to the base of the column and there is a deep sac-like structure at its base.

Distribution
Orchids in the genus Pholidota are found in China, Taiwan, the Indian Subcontinent, Cambodia, Laos, Myanmar, the Nicobar Islands, Thailand, Vietnam, Borneo, Java, the Lesser Sunda Islands, Peninsular Malaysia, the Maluku Islands, the Philippines, Sulawesi, Sumatra, the Bismarck Archipelago, New Guinea, the Solomon Islands, Queensland (Australia), Fiji, New Caledonia, the Santa Cruz Islands and Vanuatu.

Taxonomy and naming
The genus Pholidota was first formally described in 1825 by John Lindley who published the description in Hooker's Exotic Flora, Containing Figures and Descriptions of New, Rare or Otherwise Interesting Exotic Plants. The name Pholidota is derived from the Ancient Greek word pholidotos meaning "clad in scales", referring to the large bracts at the base of the flower in some species.

Species list
The following is a list of Pholidota species accepted by the World Checklist of Selected Plant Families as at January 2019:

 Pholidota advena (C.S.P.Parish & Rchb.f.) Hook.f. - Myanmar
 Pholidota aidiolepis Seidenf. & de Vogel - Thailand
 Pholidota articulata Lindl. - Guizhou, Sichuan, Tibet, Yunnan, Assam, Bhutan, Cambodia, India, Indonesia, Laos, Malaysia, Myanmar, Nepal, Thailand, Vietnam
 Pholidota camelostalix Rchb.f. - Sumatra, Java, Bali, Lombok, Timor, Flores
 Pholidota camelostalix var. camelostalix
 Pholidota camelostalix var. vaginata (Carr) de Vogel
 Pholidota cantonensis Rolfe - Fujian, Guangdong, Guangxi, Hunan, Jiangxi, Taiwan, Zhejiang.
 Pholidota carnea (Blume) Lindl. - Thailand, Malaysia, Indonesia, Philippines, New Guinea, Bismarcks
 Pholidota carnea var. carnea
 Pholidota carnea var. parviflora (Hook.f.) de Vogel
 Pholidota carnea var. pumila (Ridl.) de Vogel
 Pholidota chinensis Lindl. - Fujian, Guangdong, Guangxi, Guizhou, Hainan, Tibet, Yunnan, Zhejiang, Myanmar, Vietnam
 Pholidota clemensii Ames - Borneo
 Pholidota convallariae (C.S.P.Parish & Rchb.f.) Hook.f. - Yunnan, Assam, Bhutan, Myanmar, Thailand, Vietnam, Java, Sumatra 
 Pholidota corniculata Pfitzer & Kraenzl. in H.G.A.Engler - Assam
 Pholidota cyclopetala Kraenzl. in H.G.A.Engler - Sumatra 
 Pholidota gibbosa (Blume) Lindl. ex de Vriese - Solomons and much of Indonesia
 Pholidota globosa (Blume) Lindl. - Sumatra, Java, Bali
 Pholidota guibertiae Finet - Vietnam
 Pholidota imbricata Lindl. in W.J.Hooker - widespread from Tibet to Queensland and New Caledonia
 Pholidota katakiana Phukan - Arunachal Pradesh
 Pholidota leveilleana Schltr. - Vietnam, Guangxi, Guizhou, Yunnan 
 Pholidota longibulba Holttum - Peninsular Malaysia
 Pholidota longilabra de Vogel - Sumatra
 Pholidota longipes S.C.Chen & Z.H.Tsi - Yunnan 
 Pholidota mediocris de Vogel - Borneo
 Pholidota missionariorum Gagnep. - Bhutan, eastern India, Myanmar, Vietnam
 Pholidota nervosa (Blume) Rchb.f. - Sumatra, Java
 Pholidota niana Y.T.Liu, R.Li & C.L.Long - Yunnan 
 Pholidota pachyglossa Aver.  - Vietnam
 Pholidota pallida Lindl. - Yunnan, Bhutan, Assam, India, Laos, Myanmar, Nepal, Thailand, Vietnam, Cambodia
 Pholidota pectinata Ames - Borneo
 Pholidota pholas Rchb.f. in W.G.Walpers - southeastern China
 Pholidota protracta Hook.f. - Yunnan, Nepal, Assam, Bhutan, Myanmar 
 Pholidota pygmaea H.J.Chowdhery & G.D.Pal  - Arunachal Pradesh
 Pholidota pyrranthela Gagnep.  - Vietnam
 Pholidota recurva Lindl. - Yunnan, Bhutan, Assam, India, Myanmar, Nepal, Thailand, Vietnam 
 Pholidota roseans Schltr. - Guizhou, Vietnam
 Pholidota rubra Lindl. - Sikkim, Bhutan, Assam, Vietnam
 Pholidota schweinfurthiana L.O.Williams - Borneo
 Pholidota sigmatochilus J.J.Sm. - Sabah
 Pholidota sulcata J.J.Sm.  - Borneo
 Pholidota ventricosa (Blume) Rchb.f. - Vietnam, Malaysia, Indonesia, Philippines, New Guinea
 Pholidota wattii King & Pantl. - Assam
 Pholidota yongii J.J.Wood
 Pholidota yunnanensis Rolfe - Vietnam, Guangxi, Guizhou, Hubei, Hunan, Sichuan, Yunnan

References

External links

Pholidota photo in nature

Coelogyninae
Arethuseae genera